Walter S. "Whitey" Rimstad (September 18, 1916 – August 15, 1996) was a Canadian ice hockey player with the Lethbridge Maple Leafs. He won a gold medal at the 1950 World Ice Hockey Championships in Paris, France. The 1951 Lethbridge Maple Leafs team was inducted to the Alberta Sports Hall of Fame in 1974. He also played with the Edmonton Mercurys and New York Rovers.

References

1916 births
1996 deaths
Ice hockey people from Edmonton
Canadian ice hockey centres